Ilex bioritsensis is a species of holly (family Aquifoliaceae), native to warmer parts of China. Its leaves are fed upon by gray snub-nosed monkeys (Rhinopithecus brelichi).

References

bioritsensis
Flora of Tibet
Flora of North-Central China
Flora of South-Central China
Flora of Southeast China
Flora of Taiwan
Plants described in 1911